Bursa Archaeological Museum, shortly Bursa Museum, is a national museum in Bursa, Turkey, exhibiting archaeological artifacts found in and around the province.

References

External links
Photogallery from the museum

Archaeological museums in Turkey
Archaeological
Museums established in 1902
1902 establishments in the Ottoman Empire
Osmangazi